Sunlight Chambers is a listed residential and commercial building on Bigg Market in Newcastle upon Tyne. It was designed by architects W. & S. Owen in a modified Baroque style and was named after Lever Brothers' Sunlight detergent brand.

History 
Lever Brothers was founded in 1895 by brothers William Hesketh Lever, 1st Viscount Leverhulme (1851–1925), and James Darcy Lever (1854–1916). Together with chemist William Hough, the brothers created a soap that used glycerin and vegetable oils such as palm oil instead of tallow. The resulting soap was free-lathering. At first, it was named Honey Soap but later became "Sunlight Soap".

In 1901, the brothers hired architects W. & S. Owen to design a building for the Newcastle branch of their company. It was constructed between 1901 and 1902 and was named after Lever Brothers' then-famous soap brand.

Design 
The building is constructed in a modified Baroque style using sandstone ashlar. The building features a frieze depicting harvest and industry. Its roof consists of French tiles and its architrave-featuring windows are dormer at roof level.

Sister building in Dublin 
At almost the same time, Lever Brothers built a branch in Dublin, which they also called Sunlight Chambers. Although the Irish building was designed in an Italianate style rather than a Baroque style, both Sunlight Chambers feature a characteristic circumferential frieze.

See also 
Port Sunlight

References 

Arts centres in England
Culture in Newcastle upon Tyne
Buildings and structures in Newcastle upon Tyne
Tourist attractions in Newcastle upon Tyne
1902 establishments in England